Grafters was a British drama–comedy programme originally broadcast in the UK on ITV from 27 October 1998 to 20 December 1999 for 16 episodes over two series.

Grafters relates the lives of the Purvis brothers Joe (Robson Green) and Trevor (Stephen Tompkinson), who along with their younger cousin Simon (Darren Morfitt) run a successful building business.

The show regularly received ratings of over 9 million viewers and at the time was among ITV's most popular drama series.

Cast 
 Paul Carter – Dulwich Hill
 Robson Green – Joe Purvis
 Stephen Tompkinson – Trevor Purvis
 Darren Morfitt – Simon Purvis
 Emily Joyce – Laura
 Neil Stuke – Paul
 Carli Norris – Melanie
 Marian McLoughlin – Pippa
 Eva Pope – Janice
 Luisa Bradshaw-White – Debbie
 David Westhead – Nick Costello
 Katherine Wogan – Clare Costello
 Lesley Vickerage – Viv Casey
 Patrick Baladi – Will
 Maurice Roëves – Lennie
 James Gaddas – Ray
 Berwick Kaler – Uncle Alan
 Lisa Kay – Chloe
 Judy Goldberg – Auctioneer's Assistant

DVD releases
Entertainment One has released the complete series on DVD in Region 1 for the very first time.  Season 1 was released on 17 July 2007, while season 2 was released on 4 December 2007.

Shock Entertainment released the complete series on DVD in Australia on 12 January 2009.
Series 1 & 2 will be released on Region 2 on 26 February 2018.

References

External links

1998 British television series debuts
1999 British television series endings
1990s British drama television series
ITV television dramas
British comedy-drama television shows
Television series by ITV Studios
Television shows produced by Granada Television
English-language television shows
Television shows set in London
Television shows set in Brighton
Films and television featuring Greyhound racing